PP-203 Khanewal-I is a Constituency of Provincial Assembly of Punjab.

General elections 2013

General elections 2008

See also
 PP-202 Sahiwal-VII
 PP-204 Khanewal-II

References

External links
 Election commission Pakistan's official website
 Awazoday.com check result
 Official Website of Government of Punjab

Provincial constituencies of Punjab, Pakistan